A solar-pumped laser (or solar-powered laser) is a laser that shares the same optical properties as conventional lasers such as emitting a beam consisting of coherent electromagnetic radiation which can reach high power, but which uses solar radiation for pumping the lasing medium.  This type of laser is unique from other types in that it does not require any artificial energy source. There is even a hypothetical megastructure called a stellaser which uses a star as both the power source and the lasing medium.

Lasing media

The two most studied lasing media for solar-pumped lasers have been iodine, with a laser wavelength of 1.31 micrometers, and NdCrYAG, which lases at 1.06 micrometers wavelength.  Solar-pumped semiconductor lasers have also been proposed by Landis and others.

Applications

Solar-pumped lasers are not used commercially because the low cost of electricity in most locations means that other more efficient types of lasers that run on electrical power can be more economically used. Solar pumped lasers might become useful in off-grid locations.

Nanopowders

Very fine grained dispersed powders can be produced by the use of laser synthesis technology.

Hydrogen production

A leader in this field is Shigeaki Uchida and his team in Japan (Tokyo/Osaka).  Their design uses Fresnel lenses and a solar-pumped NdCrYAG laser to drive a magnesium-based cycle, which produces hydrogen gas as its product.

Potential spacecraft applications

Since there is no 'grid' power in space, most spacecraft today use solar power sources, mostly photovoltaic solar cells.    Powering lasers requires high levels of power, so the inefficiency of PV solar cells (usually less than 27% efficiency) motivates interest in solar pumping of lasers.
Other potential benefits of solar-pumped lasers might be reduced weight and reduced number of components, affording higher reliability (reduced number of failure modes) versus an electrically pumped laser powered from PV cells. They can also be used for deep space communications, sensors for conditions on earth, detecting and tracking objects in space, as well as power transmission.

Space propulsion

There have been proposals to use solar-pumped lasers for spacecraft beam-powered propulsion.

Solar power satellite

There have been proposals to use solar-pumped lasers for space-based solar power.

Current research
A proposal to use the solar furnace of Uzbekistan to power a solar-pumped Nd:YAG laser would have been the world's largest system of its kind, at up to 1MW of solar input power.
However, current research efforts are focused on combining the output from several smaller concentrators, an approach that is much more achievable.

See also 
 Magnesium injection cycle

References

Directed-energy weapons
Military lasers
Laser types